Waterman Reservoir (also known as Waterman's Reservoir) is a large lake along Putnam Pike in Glocester and Greenville in Providence County, Rhode Island.

It was named after Resolved Waterman, an early eighteenth century Greenville resident and landowner. Prior to the creation of the reservoir, the area was swampy, so a dam was constructed to create the reservoir and at the same time a causeway (now part of the Putnam Pike) was built so travelers no longer had to go around the swamp using Austin Avenue, which prior to the 1930s was known as (Old) Killingly Road.

See also
List of lakes in Rhode Island

References

Lakes of Rhode Island